Bishop Crowther Seminary (BCS), established as Bishop Crowther Junior Seminary in 1979 by the Diocese on the Niger,
is a private Anglican boys' boarding school located along
Works Road, Awka in Anambra State,
Nigeria.

History
The school opened on September 21, 1979 with 64 pupils under the
guidance of Rev. Dr. J.P.C Okeke. It was renamed Bishop Crowther
Seminary in 1996 and has since served both primary and secondary
school students.

Academic curriculum
Bishop Crowther Seminary offers an educational curriculum of
international standard.

Junior Secondary School
Subjects taught at the junior secondary level include English
Language/Literature, Mathematics, Igbo Language, Social Studies, Basic
Science, Agricultural Science, Business Studies, Basic Technology,
Cultural and Creative Arts, French, Computer Studies, Christian
Religious Knowledge, Civic Education, Physical and Health Education
and Moral Instruction.

Senior Secondary School
At the senior secondary level, subjects taught include English
Language, Mathematics, Literature in English, Biology, Chemistry,
Physics, Igbo Language, Agricultural Science, Technical Drawing,
Economics, Further Mathematics, Computer Science, Government,
Christian and Religious Studies, Geography, Fine Arts, History, Moral
Instruction, Data Processing, Animal Husbandry, Photography, Building
Technology, Painting and Decoration.

Admission
Candidates seeking admission to the seminary are required to go
through a set of examinations and interviews. The Council for
Seminaries and Convents in the Southeastern States of Nigeria
organizes the first examination. Each successful candidate will
undergo additional interviews conducted by the Deans of Examination
and the Quality Control Unit. Applicants for higher classes apply in
writing to the proprietor (The diocesan) after attaining the basic
requirement of at least 60% average from their previous school.

House system

Bishop Crowther Seminary is organized into a house system for
sporting and extracurricular activities. Each student is assigned to
one of 11 houses, each having its own patrons.

Current houses include:

List of BCS Principals
 Rev. Dr. J.P.C Okeke
 Rev. B.O.Nwosu
 Rev. Ekenchi
 Sir. Victor Obidike
 Rev. Canon Nnamdi B. Emendu

Notable past students
Echezonachukwu Nduka – Concert pianist, poet, and musicologist.
 Engr Chineme Christian Ofoma(CEng)UK based Chartered Engineer

References

External links
Bishop Crowther Seminary

Anglican schools in Nigeria
Education in Anambra State
1979 establishments in Nigeria
Educational institutions established in 1979
Boys' schools in Nigeria